The national flag of Curaçao represents the country of Curaçao as well as the island area within the Netherlands Antilles from 1984 until its dissolution in 2010.

The flag is a blue field with a horizontal yellow stripe slightly below the midline and two white, five-pointed stars in the canton. The blue symbolises the sea and sky (the bottom and top blue sections, respectively), divided by a yellow stroke representing the bright sun which bathes the island. The two stars represent Curaçao and Klein Curaçao, with the five points on each star symbolise the five continents from which Curaçao's people descend.

The horizontal stripes have a ratio of 5:1:2 (blue:yellow:blue). The blue is Pantone 280, and the yellow, Pantone 102.

After Aruba's adoption of its own flag (while still part of the Netherlands Antilles), Curaçao received approval for a flag in 1979. Two thousand designs were submitted to a special council; ten were shortlisted, and the council decided on 29 November 1982. With some modifications, the flag was adopted on 2 July 1984.

See also
Flag of Netherlands Antilles
Flag of the Netherlands
Flag of Nauru

References

Flag
Flags of the Netherlands Antilles
National flags
Flags introduced in 1984